The Glades County Courthouse is an historic courthouse building located at 500 Avenue J in Moore Haven, Florida. Built in 1928 in the Classical Revival style, it was designed by Georgia-born American architect Edward Columbus Hosford, who is noted for the  courthouses and other buildings that he designed in Florida, Georgia and Texas.

In 1989, the Glades County Courthouse was listed in A Guide to Florida's Historic Architecture, published by the University of Florida Press.

References

External links 
 Florida's Historic Courthouses

Buildings and structures in Glades County, Florida
County courthouses in Florida
Edward Columbus Hosford buildings
Neoclassical architecture in Florida